U-dub may refer to:

 University of Washington
 University of West Alabama
 University of Wisconsin–Whitewater
 University of Wyoming